Brian Aheebwa (born 1 July 1998) is a Ugandan footballer who  plays for KCCA FC in the Uganda Super League and Uganda national team (the "Cranes") as a striker.

Youth career
At an early age, he was a member of  St. John Bosco Seminary School and in 2014 joined  Mbarara Sports Academy til 2016.

Career

Mbarara FC (2016-2020)
Aheebwa joined Mbarara City FC in 2016 graduating from  Mbarara Sports Academy. He signed a 4year contract upon joining Mbarara City FC, In 2016, he was the Regional League  top scorer with eight goals. He made his Big League 2017 debut for Mbarara City FC  against Kireka United FC. He scored his first goal against Masavu FC in March 2017. On 9 April 2017 he scored four goals for Mbarara City FC  against Nyamityobora FC. He scored 39 goals during his four-year tenure he was at Mbarara City FC.

KCCA FC
In June 2020 he joined KCCA FC and signed a 3-year contract. On 3 December 2020, he made his debut for KCCA FC against Bright Stars FC. He scored his first goal for K.C.C.A FC in that game, K.C.C.A FC won 2–1.

Personal life
Aheebwa was born on 1 July 1998 in Kibale District. He attended Kahunde Primary School, St. John Bosco Seminary Secondary School in Hoima before joining St. Kirigwajjo Secondary School where he received his UCE. Between 2014 and 2015, Aheebwa was admitted to Mayanja Memorial Medical Training Institute where he graduated with a certificate in Nursing thus a certified clinical officer.

References

External links 

Brian Aheebwa becomes KCCA FC 6th signing

Living people
Association football forwards
Ugandan footballers
Uganda international footballers
1998 births
Mbarara City FC players
Kampala Capital City Authority FC players
Uganda A' international footballers
2020 African Nations Championship players